Wassail (most likely from Old Norse "ves heill") is a beverage made from hot mulled cider, ale, or wine and spices, drunk traditionally as an integral part of wassailing, an ancient English Yuletide drinking ritual and salutation either involved in door-to-door charity-giving or used to ensure a good harvest the following year.

Etymology

According to the Oxford English Dictionary, the word "wassail" originated as a borrowing from the Old Norse salutation ves heill, corresponding to Old English hál wes þú or wes hál – literally meaning 'be in good health' or 'be fortunate'. It was initially used in the sense of 'hail' or 'farewell', without any drinking connotation. The English interjection "" is a cognate of the etymon of the second part of "wassail", and was probably influenced by the Old English phrase.

The expression later became part of the drinking formula "wassail...drinkhail" which, the OED suggests, initially arose in England among the Anglo-Danes, and from there spread to the native population, being considered a specifically Anglo Saxon characteristic by the 12th century. The earliest record is of around 1140, in Geoffrey of Monmouth's telling of the Rowena story, which has wes heil..drinc heil (or, in a variant reading, was heil).

The earliest example of the drinking phrases in a specifically English context comes from a manuscript of 1275, preserving a 12th-century text which has . [That friend said to [the other] friend...,"beloved friend, wassail!"; the other said, "drinkhail!"]

By  1300, the sense had extended from a toast to the drink itself, especially to the spiced ale used in Twelfth-night and Christmas Eve celebrations. By 1598 it was being applied to the custom of drinking healths on those nights. Shakespeare's 1603 use of "Keep wassel" in Hamlet i. iv. 10 was the first record of the term's use in a more general sense of "carousal" or "revelling".

Beverage

Wassail is a hot, mulled punch often associated with Yuletide, often drunk from a 'wassail bowl'. The earliest versions were warmed mead into which roasted crab apples were dropped and burst to create a drink called 'lambswool' drunk on Lammas day, still known in Shakespeare's time. Later, the drink evolved to become a mulled cider made with sugar, cinnamon, ginger and nutmeg, topped with slices of toast as sops and drunk from a large communal bowl. Modern recipes begin with a base of wine, fruit juice or mulled ale, sometimes with brandy or sherry added. Apples or oranges are often added to the mix, and some recipes also call for beaten eggs to be tempered into the drink. Great bowls turned from wood, pottery or tin often had many handles for shared drinking and highly decorated lids; antique examples can still be found in traditional pubs. Hence the first stanza of the traditional carol Gloucestershire Wassail; variations of which were known to have been sung as far back as the 1700s, and possibly earlier:

At Carhampton, near Minehead, the Apple Orchard Wassailing is held on Old Twelfth Night (17 January) as a ritual to ask the gods for a good apple harvest. The villagers form a circle around the largest apple tree, hang pieces of toast soaked in cider in the branches for the robins, who represent the 'good spirits' of the tree. A shotgun is fired overhead to scare away evil spirits, and the group sings the following being the (last verse):

Lamb's wool
"Lamb's wool" or "lambswool" is an early variety of wassail, brewed from ale, baked apples, sugar and various spices.

British-Irish antiquarian Charles Vallancey proposed that the term "lambswool" is a corruption of the name of a pagan Irish festival, "Lamas Ubhal", during which a similar drink was had. Alternatively, the name may derive from the drink's similar appearance to the wool of lambs. Ale is occasionally replaced by ginger ale for children, especially around Halloween and New Year.

Culture

Wassailing

In the cider-producing counties in the South West of England (primarily Cornwall, Devon, Somerset, Dorset, Gloucestershire, and Herefordshire) or South East England (Kent, Sussex, Essex, and Suffolk), as well as Jersey, wassailing refers to a traditional ceremony that involves singing and drinking to the health of trees on Twelfth Night in the hopes that they might better thrive. The purpose of wassailing is to awaken the cider apple trees and to scare away evil spirits to ensure a good harvest of fruit in the Autumn. The ceremonies of each wassail vary from village to village but they generally all have the same core elements. A wassail King and Queen lead the song or a processional tune to be played/sung from one orchard to the next; the wassail Queen is then lifted into the boughs of the tree where she places toast soaked in wassail from the clayen cup as a gift to the tree spirits (and to show the fruits created the previous year). In some counties, the youngest boy or "Tom Tit" will stand in for the Queen and hang the cider-soaked toast in the tree. Then an incantation is usually recited.

A folktale from Somerset reflecting this custom tells of the Apple Tree Man, the spirit of the oldest apple tree in an orchard, and in whom the fertility of the orchard is thought to reside. In the tale a man offers his last mug of mulled cider to the trees in his orchard and is rewarded by the Apple Tree Man who reveals to him the location of buried gold.

Popular culture

Modern music
British folk rock band Steeleye Span opened their third album Ten Man Mop, or Mr. Reservoir Butler Rides Again (1971) with an extended, minor-key version of "Gower Wassail", Tim Hart singing the traditional verses and the others joining the chorus.

The British rock band Blur released a song titled "The Wassailing Song", with each member taking a verse. The release was limited to 500 7-inch pressings, given out at a concert in 1992. The version of "The Wassailing Song" performed by Blur was later adapted in a recording by The Grizzly Folk, who have stated that the arrangement bears a close resemblance to the "Gloucestershire Wassail".

In her song "Oh England My Lionheart", on the 1978 album Lionheart, Kate Bush sings, "Give me one wish, and I'd be wassailing in the orchard, my English rose."

The alternative rock band Half Man Half Biscuit from Tranmere, England, included a song named "Uffington Wassail" on their 2000 album Trouble over Bridgwater. With its references to the Israeli Eurovision contestant Dana International, the Sealed Knot English Civil War re-enactment society, and also to the skier Vreni Schneider, the meaning of the song's title in this context is a little obscure.

In 2013 Folk Rock musician Wojtek Godzisz created an arrangement of the traditional Gloucestershire Wassail words with original music for the Pentacle Drummers' first Annual Wassail festival (2013), called "Wassail".

For the Pentacle Drummers' second Wassail festival (2014), the pagan rock band Roxircle also wrote a Wassail song especially for the event called "Wassail (Give Thanks to the Earth)". The Pentacle Drummers encourage their headline acts to write a song centered around wassailing, a way to keep the tradition alive.

The English progressive rock band Big Big Train released an EP entitled "Wassail" in 2015, named for the title track.

Yorkshire-based folk singer Kate Rusby included the track "Cornish Wassail" on her 2015 album, The Frost Is All Over.

Television
Wassail was mentioned in the television show Mystery Science Theater 3000. Crow T. Robot and Tom Servo ask Mike Nelson to provide some. When asked to explain further what exactly wassail is, they admit to having no idea. However, they offer a guess that it might be an "anti-inflammatory". Upon actually getting some, they describe it as "skunky", discovering it to be a 500-year-old batch.

It was mentioned and explained to Bing Crosby by Frank Sinatra in a special episode of the Frank Sinatra Show entitled "Happy Holidays with Bing and Frank" released 20 December 1957.

In 2004, the alternative Christmas message was presented by The Simpsons who close out with a cup of "traditional British wassail". When the director cuts, they spit it out in disgust, with Bart remarking that it tasted "like hurl".

Wassail was featured on the BBC Two special Oz and Hugh Drink to Christmas, aired in December 2009. Oz Clarke and Hugh Dennis sampled the drink and the wassailing party in Southwest England as part of their challenge to find Britain's best Christmas drinks.

During the episode "We Two Kings" on the NBC sitcom Frasier, the title character's brother Niles asks to borrow his wassail bowl; when Frasier's father Martin asks why they can't just use a punch bowl, Niles retorts, "Then it wouldn't be Wassail then would it?" In response, Martin looks up 'wassail' in the dictionary, defined as 'a Christmas punch'.

In the Good Eats holiday special episode "The Night Before Good Eats", Alton Brown is given a wassail recipe by St. Nicholas which he then must make to appease a mob of angry carolers.

In Will Vinton's Claymation Christmas Celebration, which originally aired December 21, 1987, the main characters of the special Rex and Herb talk about the term "wassail" regarding a specific Christmas carol, which is comically mis-sung by varying groups that show up throughout the show.

See also
 Apple Day
 Apple Wassail
 Here We Come A-wassailing
 List of hot beverages
 Mari Lwyd (a related tradition in Wales)

References

Bibliography
 Bladey, Conrad Jay (2002). Do the Wassail: A Short Guide to Wassail, Songs, Customs, Recipes and Traditions: How to Have a Fine Geegaw of a Wassail!, Hutman Productions, .
 Gayre, Robert (1948). Wassail! In Mazers of Mead: an account of mead, metheglin, sack and other ancient liquors, and of the mazer cups out of which they were drunk, with some comment upon the drinking customs of our forebears, Phillimore & Co. Ltd., London.

External links

 Authentic Lambswool Recipe
 Quick Lambswool Recipe
 The Whimple Wassail (Whimple History Society)
 Making a wassail bowl
 Wassailing history and examples
 

Mixed drinks
Christmas food
Drinking culture
Hot drinks
Cider